Marco Jay Luciano "Mark" Occhilupo (born 16 June 1966) is an Australian surfer and winner of the 1999 ASP World title.

Occhilupo, also known as "Occy", began his professional career in the World Championship Tour (WCT) at the age of 17. In September 2019, he made a brief return to the international surfing circuit and took part in the So Sri Lanka Pro 2019 tournament which also marked his first visit to the country.

Life and career
Occhilupo was born on 16 June 1966 in Kurnell, New South Wales, Occhilupo's father was Italian and his mother was originally from New Zealand. Marco began surfing at the age of nine, and soon moved to neighboring Cronulla.

He won his first amateur schoolboys' contest at 13 and followed up with two Cadet State Titles. After the tenth grade, he left home as an ASP trialist. Virtually unnoticed, he advanced to the Top 16 at year's end and secured a seed for the following year.

In 1984, at age 17, Occhilupo's high performance standards took him to the top of the ASP ratings. At Jeffreys Bay, his powerful and aggressive style were an advantage in backside surfing. Occhilupo hovered around the top five in the rankings, and was becoming popular in the United States when Tom Curren was at the peak of his career. The two were rivals in surfing's biggest spectator event, the Op Pro, which Occhilupo won in 1985 after beating Curren in a three-heat final and again in the 1986 Op. Aspiring to be an actor, Occhilupo played himself in the 1987 Hollywood Cult-Classic, North Shore.

The young surfer struggled with depression and substance abuse during his years on the tour, and eventually, exhausted by his lifestyle, he threw a quarterfinal heat at the Op, headed home to Cronulla, and quit the World Tour.

Over the next several years, he made a couple of half-hearted comeback attempts and remained in the public eye as a repeating star of Jack McCoy's Billabong videos. He married Beatrice Ballardie in 1993 and built a house near Kirra. After reaching a weight of 111-kilos, he began a training program under McCoy in Western Australia that helped him shed 34 kilos and regained his form.

Occhilupo re-entered professional surfing in 1995, and after some major wins won the world title in 1999 at age 33. He has since retired and lives in Bilambil Heights, New South Wales, with his wife Beatrice and stepson Rainer. He made a comeback return for an international surfing event in 2019 after 20 years and competed in So Sri Lanka Pro 2019. However he recorded a modest score of 8.74 and was knocked out of Round 3 of the event.

Career victories

Post surfing
Occhilupo is currently a presenter on the Australian cable television channel Fuel TV.

He was a contestant in the 2011 season of the Australian version of Dancing with the Stars on Channel Seven, and was partnered with Jade Brand. They were the third couple to be eliminated from the competition.

His surname, Occhilupo, is Italian and means "eyes of the wolf." However, his nickname is "The Raging Bull."

He currently resides with his family in Bilambil Heights, a hillside suburb of the Gold Coast neighbouring town Tweed Heads.

He currently operates a successful podcast called the Occ-Cast which features Occhilupo talking to some of the most famous and interesting people in surfing, including Kelly Slater and Mick Fanning.

References

External links

1966 births
World Surf League surfers
Australian people of New Zealand descent
Australian people of Italian descent
Australian surfers
Living people
People from the Sutherland Shire
Sportsmen from New South Wales
People from Tweed Heads, New South Wales
Sportspeople from the Gold Coast, Queensland
Sportspeople from Sydney